Tarnowo may refer to the following places:
Tarnowo, Oborniki County in Greater Poland Voivodeship (west-central Poland)
Tarnowo, Piła County in Greater Poland Voivodeship (west-central Poland)
Tarnowo, Podlaskie Voivodeship (north-east Poland)
Tarnowo, Poznań County in Greater Poland Voivodeship (west-central Poland)
Tarnowo, Goleniów County in West Pomeranian Voivodeship (north-west Poland)
Tarnowo, Łobez County in West Pomeranian Voivodeship (north-west Poland)
Tarnowo, Myślibórz County in West Pomeranian Voivodeship (north-west Poland)
Tarnowo, Stargard County in West Pomeranian Voivodeship (north-west Poland)